Worle railway station, on the Bristol to Exeter line, serves the Worle, West Wick and St Georges suburbs of Weston-super-Mare in North Somerset, England. Its three-letter station code is WOR. It was opened in 1990 by British Rail. The station, which has two platforms, is managed by Great Western Railway, the seventh company to be responsible for the station, and the third franchise since privatisation in 1997. The station's car park was significantly expanded in 2013.

The line through Worle is not electrified, but there is significant local support for it to be electrified as part of the 21st-century modernisation of the Great Western Main Line, partly motivated by worries that unless the line is electrified, Weston-super-Mare will lose direct services to London.

Description 
Worle railway station is located in the east of Weston-super-Mare, North Somerset serving the suburbs of Worle, West Wick and St Georges. The surrounding area is primarily residential, but with several commercial developments, including the Worle Parkway office development next to the station. The station is located just off the B3440 Bristol Road, near the M5 motorway junction 21 and the A370. There is a car park on the north, east and south sides of the station. The station is oriented along an axis at 57 degrees to the meridian.

There are two platforms, on either side of the two tracks through the station. The southern platform, platform 1, serves westbound trains (towards  and ); the northern platform, platform 2, serves eastbound trains (towards Bristol). Access between the platforms is via an open footbridge with long, sloped ramps for step-free access. Ticket machines are available, and a small ticket office operates during the weekday morning peak, but the station is otherwise unstaffed. Help points are provided, allowing travellers to ask questions of a call centre. There are metal and glass waiting shelters on both platforms – two on the eastbound platform and one on the westbound. Most recently, improved lighting and CCTV has been provided and for the first time since construction, electronic train arrival boards with automated voice announcements have been provided on both platforms and also a silent, less detailed digital arrivals / departures board adjacent to the ticket office.

 west of the station is Worle Junction, where the single-track loop line to Weston-super-Mare diverges from the main line towards Taunton.

Services 

The station is managed by Great Western Railway, who operate all rail services from the station. The typical journey time to Bristol Temple Meads is 25 minutes, to Weston-super-Mare is 8 minutes.

Services between London Paddington and Weston-super-Mare call at Worle in the early morning and evening, running non-stop between Bristol Temple Meads and Nailsea & Backwell. From Monday to Friday there are four morning services and one evening service to London, with seven services from London, all in the evening. There are five services to and six from London on Sundays, spread throughout the day, with one service extended to Taunton and another to Exeter. The typical journey time to London is 2 hours 15 minutes.

Services to and from London are formed of Class 800s, which are longer than the station, so passengers in the front carriages have to move to a different carriage to get out. Passengers are prevented from getting out onto the tracks by a selective door-opening system.

CrossCountry services pass through the station throughout the day, operating services between Cornwall and Scotland, but do not stop. Occasional Great Western Railway intercity services between London and Weston-super-Mare or Taunton and Exeter also pass through non-stop.

|- style="text-align: center;"
| rowspan="4" | 
| rowspan="4" style="background:#;" |  
| Great Western Railway(Severn Beach – Weston-super-Mare)
| rowspan="4" style="background:#;" |  
| 
|- style="text-align: center;"
| Great Western Railway(Cardiff Central – Penzance)
| 
|- style="text-align: center;"
| rowspan="2" | Great Western Railway(London Paddington – Taunton)
| 
|- style="text-align: center;"
|

History 

The line, engineered by Isambard Kingdom Brunel, was built as  broad-gauge but was reconstructed as a mixed-gauge line to accommodate local -gauge traffic by 1 June 1875. Services were operated by the Great Western Railway (GWR) on behalf of the B&ER until 1 May 1849. The B&ER then took over its own workings until the company was amalgamated into the GWR on 1 January 1876. Broad-gauge trains ceased operation on 20 May 1892. When the railways were nationalised by the Transport Act 1947, the line became part of the Western Region of British Railways.

The modern Worle railway station is the fourth station to serve Worle. There was also a station on the nearby Weston, Clevedon and Portishead Light Railway, which was known as Worle from 1897 to 1913, then as Worle (Moor Lane) until 1917, and as Worle Town until closure in 1940.

The station at Worle was developed as a joint initiative between British Rail and Avon County Council. It cost £700,000 and was built using lightweight construction materials due to being sited on marshy ground. The station was opened on 24 September 1990 by Councillor Betty Perry, the chair of Avon Council. The first train was a westbound Regional Railways service, operated by  Sprinter DMU 150270. All services were local ones – no scheduled intercity services would call at Worle until 2007.

Upon the privatisation of British Rail in 1997, services were franchised to Wales & West, which was in turn succeeded in 2001 by Wessex Trains, an arm of National Express. The Wessex franchise was amalgamated with the Great Western franchise into the Greater Western franchise from 2006, and responsibility passed to First Great Western, a subsidiary company of FirstGroup, which was later rebranded Great Western Railway. Great Western Railway services to and from London Paddington started calling at Worle in 2007. Due to the trains being longer than the platforms, a selective door opening system was used to prevent passengers opening doors which were not adjacent to the platform.

In 2012, plans to enhance the station's facilities were approved by the Department for Transport. The works, part of a large transport scheme called the Weston Package, included construction of a new council run car park containing 320 spaces on the South side of the station, better facilities for cyclists and motorcyclists, and a bus interchange. A bus link to the nearby Queensway retail park was also included in the scheme. The expansion took over unused land to the east and south of the station, and required the removal of slowworms and grass snakes to a nature reserve in Cheddar. The work, which started in April 2013, was completed later the same year with the new car park opening on 3 September 2013.

Worle has had a large number of incidents of railway vandalism and antisocial behaviour, and the stretch of line through Worle is considered one of the most vandalised in the United Kingdom – obstructions have been left on the line and stones have being thrown at railway staff. There have been several incidents of train guards being attacked by passengers who refused to pay their fares, including one incident where the guard was dragged from the train and knocked to the ground. Vandals have also damaged the station's ticket machines, attacked passengers and slashed the tyres of cars parked at the station.

Future 
Worle is on the Weston-super-Mare/ corridor, one of the main axes of the Greater Bristol Metro, a rail transport plan which aims to enhance transport capacity in the Bristol area. The group Friends of Suburban Bristol Railways supports the electrification of the line through Nailsea & Backwell, as does MP for Weston-super-Mare John Penrose.

Notes

References 

Railway stations in Weston-super-Mare
Former Great Western Railway stations
Railway stations in Great Britain opened in 1884
Railway stations in Great Britain closed in 1922
Railway stations opened by British Rail
Railway stations in Great Britain opened in 1990
Railway stations served by Great Western Railway
DfT Category F1 stations